Lee Gregory may refer to:
 Lee Gregory (baseball) (born 1938), American baseball pitcher
 Lee Gregory (footballer) (born 1988), English footballer for Sheffield Wednesday

See also
 Gregory Lee (disambiguation)